"Inner path" in spirituality and related topics may refer to
Involution (philosophy)
Introspection
Mysticism
Esoterism